Mining Weekly is South Africa’s premier source of weekly news on mining developments in Africa’s most important industry. Mining Weekly provides in-depth coverage of mining projects & the personalities reshaping the mining industry. The publication is an essential source of information for those involved in the mining sector.

History and profile
Mining Weekly was first published in 1995 by Creamer Media an independent media publishing company based in Johannesburg, South Africa. The company was founded by Martin Creamer in 1981. On 13 March 1981, the first edition of Creamer Media's other weekly news magazine, Engineering News was published.

The latest news and developments in the following mining sectors are available to readers of the magazine and visitors to the website, including Base Metals, Coal, Diamonds, Ferrous Metals, Gold, Platinum, Silver and Uranium. Key service areas and topics related to the mining industry such as Health and Safety, Legislative and Environmental aspects are reported on daily.

References

External links
 Official website

1995 establishments in South Africa
Magazines established in 1995
Mass media in Johannesburg
News magazines published in Africa
Magazines published in South Africa
Weekly magazines published in South Africa